Kiss the Girls can refer to the following:

 A modified line from the nursery rhyme "Georgie Porgie"
 Kiss the Girls (1965 film), a Greek film
 Kiss the Girls (novel), a 1995 James Patterson novel
 Kiss the Girls (1997 film), a film adaptation of the novel

See also
 Kiss the Girls and Make Them Die, a 1966 Italian/American film
 Kiss The Girls: Make Them Cry, a 1979 video art piece
 "Kiss the Girl", a 1989 song